Tang-e Rud (also Romanized as Tang-e Rūd) is a village in Faryab Rural District, in the Central District of Rudan County, Hormozgan Province, Iran. At the 2006 census, its population was 389, from 78 families.

References 

Populated places in Rudan County